Proterosuchidae is an early family of basal archosauriforms whose fossils are known from the Latest Permian and the Early Triassic of Europe, Asia, Africa, Australia and possibly South America. The name comes from Greek πρότερο- ("first") and σοῦχος ("crocodile").

Description

The limbs are short and indicate a sprawling posture, like contemporary lizards but unlike most later archosaurs.
 
Their most characteristic feature is a distinct down-turning of the premaxilla (the front of the upper jaw, which overhangs the lower jaw).

Evolutionary history
The terminal Permian catastrophe, which killed off 95% of all types of life, cleared the world of all large therapsids and allowed the proterosuchids to become the top predators.  Within the space of five million years the proterosuchids had evolved to fill a wide variety of terrestrial and semi-aquatic niches. The proterosuchids represent perhaps the earliest adaptive radiation of the archosaurs. They gave rise to the Erythrosuchidae some time in the Early Triassic.

Classification

Genera

Phylogeny
Recent studies consider Proterosuchidae to be at least a partially paraphyletic grouping, meaning that it does not form a true clade with a single common ancestor and proterosuchids as its only descendants. Instead, they are a chain of successively basal archosauriforms. Below is a cladogram from Ezcurra (2016), that reexamined all historical members of the "Proterosuchia" (a polyphyletic historical group including proterosuchids and erythrosuchids). The placement of fragmentary taxa that had to be removed to increase tree resolution are indicated by dashed lines (in the most derived position that they can be confidently assigned to). Taxa that are nomina dubia are indicated by the note "dubium". Bold terminal taxa are collapsed. Ezcurra (2016) recovered a monophyletic Proterosuchidae containing only Archosaurus and the species of Proterosuchus, however some species (e.g. Chasmatosuchus spp, Vonhuenia friedrichi) are too fragmentary to resolve whether they also fall into Proterosuchidae. Tasmaniosaurus, Fugusuchus, Sarmatosuchus, Cuyosuchus and the "Long Reef proterosuchid" (SAM P41754) on the other hand were recovered confidently outside of Proterosuchidae.

References

Further reading
 Benton, M. J. (2000), Vertebrate Paleontology, 2nd Ed.; (2004) 3rd edition Blackwell Science Ltd
 Carroll, R. L. (1988), Vertebrate Paleontology and Evolution, WH Freeman & Co.

External links 

 Proterosuchidae  
 Proterosuchidae - list of species (Mikko's Phylogeny Archive)

Prehistoric reptile families
Prehistoric archosauriforms
Lopingian first appearances
Early Triassic extinctions
Taxa named by Friedrich von Huene